"Oh Japan (Our Time Is Now)" (stylized as "Oh Japan ~Our Time Is Now~") is the only single by Japan-based supergroup Tak Matsumoto Group, released on March 31, 2004. It was used as the theme song for TV Asahi Network Sports 2004.

The single debuted at number 3 on the Oricon Singles Chart and was the 95th best-selling single of 2004. It later went gold in April.

Promotion and release 
The song was first previewed by B'z, Tak Matsumoto's band, on their website on March 21, 2004, ten days before the single released. The song was then played live on various TV shows, including Hey! Hey! Hey! Music Champ and Music Station Special.

Track listing

Personnel 
Tak Matsumoto Group
 Tak Matsumoto – guitars, rap on "Oh Japan (Our Time Is Now)"
 Eric Martin – lead vocals
 Jack Blades – bass

Additional musicians
 Brian Tichy – drums
 Shinichiro Ohta – background vocals on "Trapped"

Charts

Weekly charts

Year-end charts

Certifications

References 

2004 debut singles
2004 songs
Being Inc. singles
Songs written by Tak Matsumoto
Songs written by Jack Blades